Ashmont, Alberta is a hamlet in northern Alberta, Canada within the County of St. Paul No. 19.

Ashmont is surrounded by numerous lakes, such as Upper Mann Lake, Batty Lake, Lottie Lake, Floatingstone Lake and Garner Lake. Many provincial recreation areas are established on the shores of these lakes.

A first settler named the community after his native home in Ashmont, Boston. Ashmont began as a farming community in the early part of the 20th century.  At its peak in the 1960s it boasted a grain elevator, four general stores, a pool hall, Legion Hall, two gas stations and a school.  As is typical of many small rural communities it has fallen on hard times.  Only one store remains, kept alive by the local lake communities and a relatively large school (K to 12).

Demographics 

See also 
List of communities in Alberta
List of designated places in Alberta
List of hamlets in Alberta

References 

Hamlets in Alberta
Designated places in Alberta
County of St. Paul No. 19